The pied water tyrant (Fluvicola pica) is a small passerine bird in the tyrant flycatcher family. It breeds in tropical South America from Panama and Trinidad south to Bolivia.

Taxonomy
The pied water tyrant was described by the French polymath Georges-Louis Leclerc, Comte de Buffon in 1779 in his Histoire Naturelle des Oiseaux from a specimen collected in Cayenne, French Guiana. The bird was also illustrated in a hand-coloured plate engraved by François-Nicolas Martinet in the Planches Enluminées D'Histoire Naturelle which was produced under the supervision of Edme-Louis Daubenton to accompany Buffon's text. Neither the plate caption nor Buffon's description included a scientific name but in 1783 the Dutch naturalist Pieter Boddaert coined the binomial name Muscicapa pica in his catalogue of the Planches Enluminées. The pied water tyrant is now placed in the genus Fluvicola that was introduced by the English naturalist William John Swainson in 1827. The species in monotypic. The genus name is derived from a combination of Latin fluvius meaning "river and -cola meaning "dweller". The specific epithet pica is Latin for "magpie".

Description
The pied water tyrant is 13.5 cm long and weighs 13g. Adults are mainly white with a black nape, back, wings and tail. Sexes are similar, although the female may have some brown mixed with the black, and immature birds are brown where the adult is black. The call is a nasal djweeooo.

Distribution and habitat
This species is found in marshy savannahs and the edges of mangrove swamps. The nest is a feather-lined oval ball of grasses and other plant material, with a side entrance. It is placed at the end of a branch near or over water. Both sexes incubate the typical clutch of two or three creamy-white eggs, which are marked with a few brown spots. Cowbirds sometimes parasitise the nest.

Pied water tyrants often bob up and down when perched, and have a fluttering "butterfly" display flight. They forage for insects, their staple diet, in low waterside vegetation.

References

External links
"Pied water tyrant" videos on the Internet Bird Collection
Pied water tyrant photo gallery VIREO
Photo-High Res; Article geometer.org–"Trinidad and Tobago"
Photo-High Res(no. 1 of 3); Article oiseaux

pied water tyrant
Birds of Panama
Birds of Colombia
Birds of Venezuela
Birds of Trinidad and Tobago
Birds of the Guianas
pied water tyrant